The Bigby Formation is a geologic formation in Tennessee. It preserves fossils dating back to the Ordovician period.

See also

 List of fossiliferous stratigraphic units in Tennessee
 Paleontology in Tennessee

References
 

Ordovician geology of Tennessee